Putative uncharacterized protein C6orf52 (C6orf52) is a protein in humans that is encoded by the gene "C6orf52" and has six known isoforms. C6orf52 was identified in 2002 by The National Institutes of Health Mammalian Gene Collection (MGC) Program.  C6orf52 has one known paralog, tRNA selenocysteine 1-associated protein 1 (TRNAU1AP).

Gene
The cytogenetic location of C6orf52 is 6p24.2 on the shorthand of chromosome 6. It is 23,379 nucleotides long, spanning from nucleotide 10671418 to 10694797 and has a molecular weight of 17,383 Da with 9 different exons. C6orf52 has no common aliases although the major protein product is sometimes referred to as "Q5T4I8".

mRNA

C6orf52 is known to undergo alternative splicing and has six known isoforms of varying length.

Proteins

Isoforms
Q5T4I8 has six known isoforms of varying amino acid length.

Composition
The protein composition is relatively high in glutamic acid and serine residue levels and is relatively low in tryptophan and arginine when compared to the average human protein composition.

Post-translational modifications
C6orf52 has two commonly predicted post-translational modifications present in the highly conserved domain. The lysine at position 123 (of the major protein) within the highly conserved domain is expected to undergo sumoylation often, while the tyrosine at position 128 is expected to undergo phosphorylation. Sumoylation sites allow for the binding of SUMO (small ubiquitin-like modifier protein) which are known to alter different functional parameters of proteins such as subcellular localization, protein parenting, DNA binding and transactivation functions of transcription factors.  Tyrosine phosphorylation is associated with many things, namely growth factor signaling and cell differentiation during development which are recurring aspects of C6orf52.

Structure
The secondary structure  of C6orf52 consists mostly of coiled regions, however there is an extended alpha helix region within the highly conserved domain.

Subcellular localization
It is predicted to be a non-transmembrane protein that is located within the nucleus.

Expression
Tissue expression is highest within the oocyte, with high expression in the testes and female gonad.

Expression is extremely high (2000-3000 transcripts per million) in the first stages of embryonic development up until the blastocyst.

Clinical Significance
Two proteins in cattle that have been linked to fat or energy metabolism were predicted to be similar to C6orf52, however there is no known clinical study done examining C6orf52.

Homology

Paralogs
C6orf52 has one identified paralog, tRNA selenocysteine 1-associated protein 1 (TRNAU1AP), which is located on chromosome one at 1p35.3. TRNAU1AP is involved selenocysteine biosynthesis, selenoproteins synthesis efficiency enhancement and may be involved in the methylation of tRNA(Sec).

Orthologs
C6orf52 is conserved through many species. It can be found it many mammals, reptiles, and birds, such as the Zebra Finch.

There is a domain of high conservation across species starting near the last third of the polypeptide.

References

Human proteins